PC Player may refer to:

 PC Player (British magazine), a British computing magazine
 PC Player (German magazine), a German computing magazine